Robert Kubaczyk (born 4 August 1986 in Wolsztyn) is a Polish athlete, sprinter, member of the Polish Team in the 2012 Summer Olympics. He represents the club of AZS Poznań and Poland in the 4 × 100 m relay race.

Competition record

Personal bests
Outdoor
100 metres – 10.35 (1.0 m/s) (Bydgoszcz 2009)
200 metres – 21.02 (-0.2 m/s) (Belgrade 2009)

Indoor
60 metres – 6.71 (Spała 2012)
200 metres – 21.27 (Spała 2012)

References

External links

 Profile of Robert Kubaczyk

1986 births
Living people
Polish male sprinters
Athletes (track and field) at the 2012 Summer Olympics
Olympic athletes of Poland
People from Wolsztyn
Sportspeople from Greater Poland Voivodeship
Universiade medalists in athletics (track and field)
Universiade silver medalists for Poland
Medalists at the 2009 Summer Universiade
21st-century Polish people